Mary Motley Kalergis (born July 4, 1951), is an author, photographer and interviewer.

Overview 
Kalergis' photography has been exhibited in museums and galleries including the Smithsonian Institution, the Chrysler Museum of Art, the Fralin Museum, the Virginia Museum of Fine Arts, the New York State Museum, and others.

Kalergis taught at the University of Virginia and the International Center of Photography in New York.

Kalergis' most recent published work is a book on fox hunting entitled Foxhunters Speak. In 2000, Kalergis' book Seen and Heard: Teenagers Talk About Their Lives was awarded an American Library Association Award for Best Books for Young Adults.

Kalergis lives in Charlottesville, Virginia, with her husband, pharmaceutical entrepreneur David Kalergis.

Books 
Her published books include 

 Foxhunters Speak (Derrydale Press),
 Considering Adoption (Atelerix Press),
 Love In Black & White (Kensington Publishing),
 Charlottesville Portrait (Howell Press),
 Seen and Heard: Teenagers Talk About Their Lives (Stewart Tabori, & Chang),
 With This Ring: A Portrait of Marriage (The Chrysler Museum of Art),
 Home of the Brave (E.P. Dutton), 
 Mother: A Collective Portrait (E.P. Dutton)
 Giving Birth (Harper & Row)

References 

Living people
American photographers
Photographers from Virginia